Lego Star Wars: The Resistance Rises is a five-episode Lego Star Wars short form computer animated series that debuted on Disney XD on February 15, 2016. A comedic prequel to the 2015 film Star Wars: The Force Awakens, it focuses on the exploits of Star Wars characters from that film, as well as legacy characters.

Characters
The first episode, "Poe to the Rescue", features characters Poe Dameron, C-3PO, Kylo Ren, Captain Phasma, Admiral Ackbar and BB-8. Later episodes include Han Solo, Chewbacca, Maz Kanata, Lando Calrissian, Rey, Unkar Plutt, and Finn.

Episodes

References

External links
 
 
 

2010s American animated television miniseries
2010s American comic science fiction television series
2016 American television series debuts
2016 American television series endings
American children's animated action television series
American children's animated space adventure television series
American children's animated comic science fiction television series
American computer-animated television series
Disney XD original programming
English-language television shows
Interquel television series
Resistance Rises
Star Wars animated television series
Star Wars: The Resistance Rises
Star Wars: The Resistance Rises
Animated television shows based on films
Television series by Lucasfilm